Baksa is a given name, derived from an old Hungarian male name and probably of Slavic origin. 

Slavic given names